Bollo is a typical and very popular bread in Seville, in the south of Spain. It contains flour, water, sourdough, salt and little yeast. It is a white bread, thin crust and bregada dough, which results in a spongy but very compact crumb. Each unit weighs between 150 and 200 gr, is about 20 cm long and the traditional scoring consists of a single longitudinal cut. It is a derivative of the Castillian candeal bread. It is consumed in the Seville area and practically all of western Andalusia. The bollo is a classic among the breads produced in Alcalá de Guadaíra, a city with a great baking tradition.

The candeal, bregada or sobada dough is a traditional bread dough from Spain. Their names refer to the process (sobar or bregar la masa, "to knead strongly the dough") that is made with the help of a machine with two cylinders called sobadora or bregadora. By means of this technique, a harder, malleable and homogeneous mass is left, and with a low percentage of water. The fermentation process is short so that the crumb remains tight. Two variants of the bollo are the telera, whose central part is higher, and the albarda, which is basically a bollo without peaks.

Bollo and picos is a combination that accompanies most dishes in the Andalusian cuisine. It is also the typical bread with which montaditos are prepared, and can be found in the traditional Andalusian breakfast. In addition, the bollo is used to prepare torrijas during Holy Week in Seville.

See also 
 Bread culture in Spain
 Pan gallego (Galician bread)

References 

Andalusian cuisine
Culture in Seville
Spanish breads